Allan James Myers  (born 17 October 1947) is an Australian barrister, academic, businessman, landowner and philanthropist, and the previous Chancellor of the University of Melbourne.

Biography

Early life
Allan Myers was born in 1947 in Hamilton, Victoria. He was raised in Dunkeld, Victoria, where his father, John Norman Myers, worked as a butcher following his service as a stoker in the Royal Australian Navy Reserve during World War II. He has five siblings. He graduated from the University of Melbourne, where he received a Bachelor of Arts and a Bachelor of Laws, and resided at Newman College. He was editor of the Melbourne University Law Review from 1967 to 1969. He received the Supreme Court Prize in 1969. He went on to receive a Bachelor of Civil Law from the University of Oxford.

Legal career
He became a lawyer in 1971. He taught as a tutor at the Melbourne Law School. He later taught at Osgoode Hall Law School of York University in Toronto, Canada, from 1972 to 1974. He returned to the University of Melbourne in 1974, where he taught Security Law and Taxation Law from 1974 to 1988. He served as Assistant Editor of the Australian Taxation Law Review.

He was admitted to the Victorian Bar in 1975 and took Silk in 1986. He serves on the Advisory Council of the Oxford University Law Foundation. He has represented George Pell, Kerry Stokes, Lloyd Williams, Alan Bond, John Elliott, Andrew Forrest and Gina Rinehart as well as Citibank and BHP.

Business career
He sits on the board of directors of Grupa Żywiec, a Polish brewery in which he is a large shareholder, alongside investor John Higgins. He serves on the board of directors of Norinvest Holding, a Swiss financial corporation, and owns the Royal Mail Hotel, a restaurant in Dunkeld, and the Dunkeld Pastoral Company, as well as  around Dunkeld. He also owns land in the Kimberley and the Tipperary Station near Adelaide River in the Northern Territory, which he purchased from businessman Warren Anderson.

Personal life
Allen Myers is married to Maria Myers , and they live in the Melbourne suburb of Carlton. They have two daughters, Clare and Cecilia, and one son, John. Myers is a Roman Catholic and a member of the Order of Malta.

Net worth

Philanthropy
He is a former President of the National Gallery of Victoria (NGV), to which he has made significant contributions. In 2013, he donated 10 million to his alma mater, the University of Melbourne. Additionally, he served as Chairman of its BELIEVE fundraising campaign. He has served on the Boards of Trustees of the Alfred Felton Bequest, the Catholic Education Commission, the Monivae College Foundation, the Florey Institute of Neuroscience and Mental Health, the Ian Potter Foundation, and the Newman College Foundation. He has also donated to the University of Oxford.

He helped found the Grattan Institute, a non-partisan public policy think tank, and serves as its chairman. He was a member of Liberty Victoria, formerly known as the Victorian Council for Civil Liberties.

Myers endowed the Allan Myers Oxford University Scholarships, enabling students at the University of Melbourne to attend the University of Oxford. He received an Honorary Doctor of the University from the Australian Catholic University and an Honorary Doctor of Laws from his alma mater, the University of Melbourne.

In 2017 Myers was appointed as Chancellor of the University of Melbourne, succeeding Elizabeth Alexander.

Honours 
Myers was awarded the Centenary Medal in 2001 for his philanthropic and business achievements. In 2016 he was appointed Companion of the Order of Australia for "eminent service to the community through philanthropic leadership in support of major visual arts, higher education, medical research and not-for-profit organisations, to the law, and to professional learning programs". His wife, Maria, was appointed a Companion on the same day.

References

1947 births
Living people
University of Melbourne alumni
Alumni of the University of Oxford
Academic staff of the University of Melbourne
Australian King's Counsel
Australian philanthropists
Australian Roman Catholics
Officers of the Order of Australia
Recipients of the Centenary Medal
Businesspeople from Melbourne
Companions of the Order of Australia
People from Hamilton, Victoria
Chancellors of the University of Melbourne